Duncton Wood is the first novel by English author William Horwood. It is the first of a six-volume fantasy series of the same name.

Series overview
Duncton Wood and its sequels have as its protagonists anthropomorphic moles living in Moledom, a community in Great Britain. Moledom has its own social organization, history, and written language. The moles do not otherwise make use of technology or clothing.

The other focus of the Duncton series is the Stone, a religion based on the standing stones and stone circles of Britain. The novels are mainly set in and around megalith sites such as Avebury and Rollright. The eponymous wood itself is fictional, inspired by Wittenham Clumps and Wytham Woods (both near Oxford, where the author was living when he wrote the first book), and borrows its name from a village in West Sussex.

In the course of the books, individual moles travel great distances quite quickly (Duncton Wood in Oxfordshire to Siabod in Wales and back again, for example).

The Duncton Chronicles
The first volume, originally written as a standalone novel, tells the story of the romance between the Duncton moles Bracken and Rebecca as the long-held traditions surrounding the Duncton Stone recede under the rule of Rebecca's tyrannical father Mandrake and the evil and manipulative Rune.

Almost a decade later, Horwood completed two directly related sequels that follow the events of the first book, in which the central character is Bracken and Rebecca's son Tryfan. Duncton Quest (1988) and Duncton Found (1989) depict a religious conflict between The Stone and an opposing crusading order known as The Word. In the midst of these events is the birth and martyrdom of the Stone Mole, a focal messianic Christ figure named Beechen.

The Book of Silence
Duncton Tales takes place generations in the future, following Duncton Found. The inhabitants of the now-flourishing Duncton system look upon the events of the past with reverence. Prior to its completion, Duncton Tales, originally conceived as a stand-alone sequel, had evolved into the first volume of a second trilogy. The story tells of the archival librarian mole Privet and her adopted son Whillan as they face the rise of an inquisitorial cult that calls itself The Newborns. The series continues with Duncton Rising (1992) and Duncton Stone (1993)

Editions
1980 Country Life Books 
1980 Book Club Associates (London)
1980 McGraw-Hill 
1981 (September) Hamlyn 
1981 (January) Ballantine Books 
1983 (December) Ballantine Books 
1985 (July) Arrow Books 
1986 (July) Ballantine Books 
1989 (July) Arrow Books 
1990 (June) Arrow Books

References

External links
 Duncton Wood - WilliamHorwood.net
Duncton Wood

1980 British novels
Fantasy novel series
Fictional moles
English novels
Novels about animals
McGraw-Hill books